Yardwork is a studio album by singer/songwriter Stephen Bishop. The album features spare, acoustic arrangements of both new and previously recorded Stephen Bishop songs.

Track listing
All songs written by Stephen Bishop, except where noted.

2002 albums
Stephen Bishop (singer) albums